Andoni is a Local Government Area in Rivers State, Nigeria. Its headquarters is at  NgoTown. It has an area of over 233 km and a population of over 311,500 at the last census. The postal code of the area is 504. The current Executive Chairman of Andoni Local Government Area is Hon. Barr. Erastus Awortu.

List of past chairmen 

 Chief Hon. Ibiamu Ikanya
 Hon. Godson Dienye
Hon. Monwon Etete
Hon. Fynface Ayaye
Hon. Mrs. Emilia Nte

See also
 Obolo people

References

Local Government Areas in Rivers State
Populated coastal places in Rivers State
1991 establishments in Nigeria
1990s establishments in Rivers State